Medusahead is the common name of more than one species of plant, including:

Euphorbia caput-medusae, a euphorb
Taeniatherum caput-medusae, a grass